Wishmaster may refer to:

Wishmaster (film), a 1997 American film
Wishmaster (album), an album by Nightwish, and a song on that album

See also
 Wishmaster World Tour, by Nightwish (2000-2001)